Estahlak may refer to:
 Estahlak, Isfahan
 Estahlak, Markazi